Custard is food based on sweetened milk, cheese, or cream cooked with egg or egg yolk.

Custard may also refer to:

 Bird's Custard, a brand name for powdered, egg-free custard powder
 Custard (band), an Australian band
 Custard Records, an American record label
 Custard, a fictional cat in Roobarb
 Custard, a fictional cat of Strawberry Shortcake

See also

 Custer (disambiguation)
 Custards, Pennsylvania, a place in the U.S.
 List of custard desserts